The 2022 MTV Movie & TV Awards were an awards presentation that was held on June 5, 2022 at the Barker Hangar in Santa Monica, California. It was the 30th edition of the MTV Movie & TV Awards and the fifth to jointly honor movies and television.

The ceremony was hosted by Vanessa Hudgens and Tayshia Adams, with Hudgens hosting the first half of the ceremony for film and scripted television series, and Adams hosting the second half of the ceremony—MTV Movie & TV Awards: Unscripted—for awards in reality television. Unlike 2021, the two segments were held back-to-back on one night. The show was broadcast across Paramount Media Networks and was made available to stream on the company's Paramount+ service. The show is also available to stream on Binge as of June 8, 2022.

Winners and nominees
The full list of nominees was announced on May 11, 2022. Best Musical Moment nominees were announced on May 26, 2022. Winners are listed first, in bold.

Scripted Awards

Unscripted Awards

Comedic Genius Award
 Jack Black

MTV Generation Award
 Jennifer Lopez

MTV Reality Royalty Lifetime Achievement
 Bethenny Frankel

Multiple nominations

Film
The following movies received multiple nominations:
 Seven - Spider-Man: No Way Home
 Four - The Batman
 Three - The Lost City, Shang-Chi and the Legend of the Ten Rings
 Two - The Adam Project, Black Widow, Dune, Encanto, Free Guy, Halloween Kills, House of Gucci, Jackass Forever, Scream, West Side Story

Television
The following television series received multiple nominations:
 Seven - Euphoria
 Three - Loki, Selling Sunset, Summer House
 Two - Emily in Paris, Hacks, The Kelly Clarkson Show, Love & Hip Hop: Atlanta, Pam & Tommy, Peacemaker, The Real Housewives of New Jersey, Squid Game, Ted Lasso, Yellowstone

Appearances and Presenters

Scripted
 Jamie Campbell Bower, Eduardo Franco and Joseph Quinn - presented Best Breakthrough Performance
 Jenna Ortega - presented Best Music Documentary
 Pablo Schreiber - presented Best Villain
 Awkwafina - presented Comedic Genius Award
 Sydney Sweeney - presented Best Song
 Glen Powell and Jay Ellis - presented Best Fight
 Riley Keough - introduced Diplo and Swae Lee
 David Spade and Sarah Shahi - presented Best Kiss
 Lana Condor - presented Best Team
 Vanessa Hudgens - presented MTV Generation Award
 Chris Evans - presented Best Movie
 Hannah Einbinder and Megan Stalter - presented Most Frightened Performance
 Billy Eichner - presented Best Comedic Performance
 Sofia Carson - presented Best Musical Moment
 Maria Bakalova, Rachel Sennott and Chase Sui Wonders - presented Best Show

Unscripted
 Garcelle Beauvais, Kathy Hilton, Erika Jayne, Dorit Kemsley, Crystal Kung Minkoff, Kyle Richards, Lisa Rinna, Sutton Stracke, and Sheree Zampino - presented Best Reality Return
 Chris Tamburello - introduced The Challenge: Untold History
 Nick Viall and Tami Roman - presented Best Unscripted Series
 Ariana Madix, James Kennedy, and Tom Sandoval - presented Best Fight
 Taylor Armstrong, Tamra Judge, and Dorinda Medley - introduced The Real Housewives Ultimate Girls Trip: Ex-Wives Club
 Paris Hilton - presented MTV Reality Royalty Lifetime Achievement
 Chrishell Stause and Emma Hernan - introduced Selling The OC
 Paige Desorbo and Lindsay Hubbard - presented Best Talk/Topical Show
 Teresa Giudice and Melissa Gorga - presented Best Competition Series
 Kristin Cavallari - presented Best Reality Star
 Kevin Kreider and Kim Lee - presented Best Reality Romance
 Angelina Pivarnick - introduced All Star Shore
 Nicole Richie and Jeremy Scott - presented Best Docu/Reality Show

References

External links
 MTV Movie & TV Awards official site

MTV Movie
MTV Movie Awards
2022 in American cinema
MTV Movie & TV Awards
MTV Movie Awards
MTV Movie & TV Awards
June 2022 events in the United States